Aspergillus acidohumus is a species of fungus in the genus Aspergillus. It is from the Cervini section. The species was first described in 2016. It has not been reported to produce any extrolites.

Growth on agar plates

Apsergillus acidohumus has been cultivated on both Czapek yeast extract agar (CYA) plates and Malt Extract Agar Oxoid® (MEAOX) plates. The growth morphology of the colonies can be seen in the pictures below.

References 

acidohumus
Fungi described in 2016